The South Ward School was a historic building located in Cresco, Iowa, United States. It served as a grade school from 1897 to 1978. Because of low enrollment it was not used from 1949 to 1953. The 2½-story brick structure was built on a raised limestone basement, and it was capped with a hipped roof. It was significant as a good example of late Victorian-style school buildings with Romanesque influences. It was listed on the National Register of Historic Places in 1982. The school building has subsequently been torn down and replaced with a modern apartment building. It was removed from the NRHP in September of the same year.

References

School buildings completed in 1896
Victorian architecture in Iowa
Romanesque Revival architecture in Iowa
School buildings on the National Register of Historic Places in Iowa
Defunct schools in Iowa
Buildings and structures in Howard County, Iowa
National Register of Historic Places in Howard County, Iowa